Taizu Mishi is a 2005 Chinese television series produced by You Xiaogang. The series is the third instalment in a series of four television series about the history of the early Qing dynasty. It was preceded by Xiaozhuang Mishi (2003) and Huang Taizi Mishi (2004), and followed by Secret History of Kangxi (2006), all of which were also produced by You Xiaogang.

Plot
The series is based on the life of Nurhaci, the founder of the Qing dynasty. Nurhaci started his life of a warrior-king by uniting the Jurchen (later Manchu) tribes under his rule. In addition to suppressing the threat of internal conflict, Nurhaci attacks the Ming Empire's territories in northern China. Nurhaci helped to build a strong foundation for his son and successor, Huangtaiji, who eventually conquers the Ming Empire and establishes the Qing Empire.

He also is entangled between five women in his life, and this is highlighted in the series. The five women are Menggu, Naqiya, Dongge, Abahai, and Tunggiya Qingya. Dongge is a renowned beauty from the plains and loves both Nurhaci and his brother Surhaci. Tunggiya Qingya is Nurhaci's primary consort and the mother of Cuyen and Daisan. Menggu is the mother of Hong Taiji and a beautiful woman with a mysterious past. Abahai was his favorite during his later years and the mother of Dodo, Dorgon, and Ajige. Naqiya was the former wife of Li Rubai, but Nurhaci later wed Naqiya to Surhaci.

Cast
 Steve Ma as Nurhaci
 Vivian Chen as Dongge / Deyinze
 Wu Qianqian as Tunggiya Qingya
 Zhao Hongfei as Surhaci
 Shi Xiaoqun as Empress Xiaocigao
 Liu Guanxiang as Jintaiji
 Jin Qiaoqiao as Naqiya
 Cheng Lisha as Lady Abahai
 Ma Yue as Zhantai
 Wang Xufeng as Nalin
 Xu Min as Li Chengliang
 Wang Qi as Li Rubai
 Tu Honggang as Taksi
 Deng Limin as Giocangga
 Liu Can as Huangtaiji
 William Lee as Cuyen
 Wu Jiacheng as Cuyen (young)
 Shi An as Daišan
 Wang Wenjun as Amin
 Mao Linying as Xingniya
 Chen Yina as Hadaqi
 Yu Jun as Jirgalang
 Bo Guanjun as Nikan Wailan
 Li Nan as Fiongdon
 Jiang Tianyang as Eyidu
 Tang Guoqiang as Anfei Yanggu
 Han Dong as He Heli
 Chen Long as Hu'erhan

External links
  Taizu Mishi on Sina.com

2005 Chinese television series debuts
Television series set in the Qing dynasty
Mandarin-language television shows
Chinese historical television series
China Central Television original programming